Victor Augusto Souto (born 7 January 1993) is a Brazilian footballer who currently plays for Atlantic City FC of the National Premier Soccer League.

Career

Youth and college 
Souto played college soccer at the University of Akron between 2013 and 2016, but was dismissed at the beginning of the 2016 college season due to "an unspecified violation of team rules".

While at Akron, Souto appeared for Portland Timbers U23s and Orlando City U-23 in the USL PDL.

Professional 
Souto signed his first professional contract on December 29, 2016, joining United Soccer League side Pittsburgh Riverhounds ahead of their 2017 season. However, he lasted just one season with the club, and his contract option was declined by Pittsburgh on November 30, 2017.

References

External links 
 

1993 births
Living people
Brazilian footballers
Association football midfielders
Akron Zips men's soccer players
Portland Timbers U23s players
Orlando City U-23 players
Pittsburgh Riverhounds SC players
USL League Two players
USL Championship players
Brazilian expatriate footballers
Expatriate soccer players in the United States
Brazilian expatriate sportspeople in the United States
Footballers from São Paulo